Daniel William Fry (July 19, 1908 – December 20, 1992) was an American contactee who claimed he had multiple contacts with an alien and took a ride in a remotely piloted alien spacecraft on July 4, 1949. He was born in Verdon Township, Minnesota.

White Sands incident
From the White Sands Proving Ground in New Mexico where he worked, Fry had planned to join the July 4, 1949 evening festivities in nearby Las Cruces but missed the last bus. Finding the Bachelor Officers Quarters (BOQ) where he stayed too hot, he decided to explore a path in the desert he had never been down.  There, Fry claimed a 30-foot (10 m) diameter, 16 foot (5 m) high "oblate spheroid" landed in front of him, and he talked remotely with the pilot who operated the craft from a "mother ship" 900 miles (1400 km) above Earth. Fry claimed he was invited aboard and flown over New York City and back in 30 minutes. During the flight and subsequent meetings, Fry asserted that he talked with the pilot named Alan, (pronounced "a-lawn") who gave Fry information on physics, the prehistory of Earth including Atlantis and Lemuria and the foundations of civilization.

Truth or fiction
Shortly after Fry went public with his story in 1954, he failed a polygraph examination about his claims. Fry also took photos and 16 mm film of supposed UFOs, but subsequent analysis of the original footage has provided evidence both the film and photographs were a hoax.

Later, Fry claimed to have received a doctorate; the "degree" was from a mail-order company in London, UK, called Saint Andrew College and was a "Doctorate of Cosmism".

Many years later, Fry also changed the date the event took place from July 4, 1950, to July 4, 1949.

Understanding Inc.

In 1954, Fry published his first book called The White Sands Incident and a year later started an organization called Understanding which published a monthly newsletter by the same name. Understanding was eventually incorporated as a non-profit corporation, which was described in a 1959 pamphlet as "From a start of nine members at El Monte, California in 1955, Understanding Inc., has grown into an international organization of more than sixty units and many members-at-large throughout the world. These units and members have sponsored hundreds of lectures and meetings, circulated thousands of books and magazines to reach many people in the spirit of 'bringing about a greater degree of understanding among all the peoples of the earth and preparing them for their eventual inevitable meetings with other races in space."

Using Alan's ideas as a foundation, Understanding Inc. served to spread alternative social and spiritual ideas by speeches, meetings and in the newsletter. The newsletter, first published in 1956, was typically about 20 pages long, published monthly and ran for 240+ issues until October 1979.

Understanding Inc. peaked in the early sixties with about 1,500 paid members and 60 or so "Units" in America. Mid-way through its waning years in 1974, Understanding was donated 55 acres (220,000 m²) of land including eight buildings near Tonopah, Arizona by Enid Smith. The buildings, first intended as a religious college, had the coincidental feature of being round and saucer shaped. Understanding Inc. had fully taken the property over by 1976 but given Daniel's tight finances during his retirement and the falling Understanding membership, the property fell into disrepair. In late September and early October 1978, the kitchen and the library were burned to the ground by an arsonist and never rebuilt.

Understanding Inc. was considered by some to be a cult, but Daniel insisted that it wasn't in a 1969 Daily Courier article: "The group is not mystic, he says, and is not a flying saucer watching organization although some members hold definite beliefs and interests in both areas. Understanding Inc. which is a non-profit, tax exempt corporation, works on the principles that there is nothing that members are required to believe or accept or do, Dr. Fry said."  During the early 1970s, Professor Robert S. Ellwood of the University of Southern California studied many new and unconventional religious and spiritual groups in the United States. During his research, he attended a meeting held in Inglewood, California by members of Understanding, Inc. and noted that, "There is no particular religious practice connected with the meeting, although the New Age Prayer derived from the Alice Bailey writings is used as an invocation."

From 1954 onward, with little reimbursement, Fry gave thousands of lectures to organizations such as service clubs, radio and television stations. He also published other books such as Atoms, Galaxies and Understanding, To Men of Earth, Steps to the Stars, Curve of Development, Can God Fill Teeth? and Verse and Worse. He, along with other contactees would attend the yearly Spacecraft Convention at Giant Rock in Yucca Valley, California for the next twenty years, hosted by a friend and fellow contactee, George Van Tassel.

Key points in Fry's life
The first key point was in late 1919 when Emily, Fry's grandmother who was his sole guardian, made the decision to move to South Pasadena, California to be near Fry's uncle Walter. Fry would live in and around the South Pasadena area for the next 35 years and get in on the ground floor of the early rocket research which Pasadena was host to in the 1940s and 1950s.

The next important point was in 1949. After the war, when there were massive layoffs, Fry had moved to Oregon to find a way to make a living, and because of Fry's work with Edmund Sawyer at Crescent and other related rocketry work, he got a job with Aerojet setting up instrumentation to test rockets at the test range in White Sands, New Mexico. It was that year that he had his reported "incident" with Alan which altered the trajectory of his life.

Most of the events following 1919 and 1949 were a result of the changes that had happened during those years. After 1919, Fry turned his working knowledge of explosives into jobs with rockets, which evolved, thanks in part to his early involvement with Crescent, into jobs with rocket instrumentation.

After 1949, because of his alleged contact with Alan, he became a founding member of the contactee movement, formed Understanding, published 240+ issues of the Understanding newsletter, authored multiple books and gave thousands of lectures, interviews and talks. Fry became the 1972 vice-presidential nominee of the Universal Party along with the presidential nominee and fellow contactee Gabriel Green.

In December, 1978, Fry would note with frustration the dwindling membership and the library and kitchen at the Tonopah site were burned to the ground by an arsonist. Shortly before the fire, Daniel would turn over the Understanding organization to Mr. and Mrs. Sellman and move to Alamogordo, New Mexico with his second wife Florence.  Less than a year later, the Sellmans quit, along with a number of other long time board members like Tahahlita, because of Daniel's refusal to negotiate a settlement over the Tonopah site lawsuit related to Enid Smith's contested will. With the Understanding organization in tatters, the publication of the newsletter ceased in 1979 after 20 years. A year later Florence died from breast cancer.

Professional life

In his professional life, Fry worked as a "powder man" or explosives supervisor in the 1930s and 1940s on such jobs as the Salinas Dam near San Luis Obispo, California, for the Basic Magnesium Corporation and on the Pan American Highway in Honduras. From 1949 until 1954, Daniel worked at Aerojet designing, building and installing transducers for control, feedback and measurement of rockets during flight and static tests. From 1954 onward, Fry helped build the Crescent Engineering & Research Company into a multimillion-dollar company along with the founder, Edmund Vail Sawyer, eventually becoming the Vice President of Research and a stockholder. Crescent made parts related to rockets including transducers, and did JATO rocket nozzle rework during the war.

In the early 1960s, Fry sold his share in Crescent and moved to Merlin, Oregon. In the October 1963 issue of Understanding, he wrote, "During the past year and a half, Understanding has been in the process of a gradual shift of location from southern California to southern Oregon." In Merlin, he ran the Merlin Development Company until moving to Tonopah, Arizona in the 1970s. There he looked after Enid Smith until her death and managed her estate including property she had donated to Understanding, Inc. Shortly before Understanding ceased to function in 1979, Daniel retired to Alamogordo, New Mexico but a few years later restarted publication of the Understanding newsletter, by now reduced to a single 8" x 14" page, which he continued until 1989.

Personal life
Daniel William Fry was born on July 19, 1908 near a small steamboat landing on the Mississippi River called Verdon Township in the northern part of Aitkin County, Minnesota to Fred Nelson Fry and Clara Jane Baehr.  Clara died in 1916 and left Daniel and his older sister, Florence, to be raised by their grandmother while Fred found work where he could as a carpenter and labourer. Fred died two years later in 1918 during the influenza pandemic and left Daniel orphaned at the age of ten. He and his sister were reared under the guardianship of his grandmother and came with her to South Pasadena, California in 1920. Daniel attended the now defunct El Centro Elementary school and went to high school in Antelope Valley.

His parents left practically no estate and at the age of eighteen he found himself entirely dependent upon his own resources. He completed high school but because of increasing unemployment that preceded the 1930s depression he abandoned plans for university. However, he found what jobs he could and studied during the evenings. He worked through the subjects he would have taken at university by using material from the Pasadena Public Library. He became interested in chemistry and eventually specialized in the use of explosives finally settling on the new field of rocketry.

He married his first wife, Elma, in 1934 and had three children. He divorced Elma in 1964 while living in Merlin, Oregon and took up common-law residence with Bertha (aka Tahahlita) until moving to Tonopah, Arizona in the mid 1970s. There he married Florence, and before Florence died of breast cancer in 1980, they retired to Alamogordo, New Mexico. Fry then married Cleona, a local Alamogordo resident in 1982 and they remained married until his death there on December 20, 1992.

References

External links 

 DanielFry.com - for more information including pictures, videos, recordings and over 4000 pages of searchable HTML text from his books and the Understanding newsletters.
 Interview in Helsinki 1970: American doctor took a ride in a remotely piloted spacecraft YLE: Finland's national public service broadcasting company - Elävä arkisto/Living archives

1908 births
1992 deaths
People from Aitkin County, Minnesota
American UFO writers
Contactees
Ufologists
Writers from Minnesota
20th-century American non-fiction writers